The Engage Mutual Charity Man of the Match Award was a scheme by which players judged man-of-the-match for games of the 2011 Super League season nominated charities to whom donations were made.

The Super League is top level professional rugby league club competition for clubs in Europe, as of 2019. The 2011 Super League season (known as the Engage Super League XVI for sponsorship reasons) was the sixteenth season of rugby league football since the Super League format was introduced in 1996. In 2011 the league had fourteen teams: thirteen from England and one from France. In partnership with Sky Sports, Engage Mutual Assurance - title sponsor of the Super League - donated £100 to the Steve Prescott Foundation and £100 to a charity nominated by the Man of the Match, at all live televised Super League games. Over the full season, donations to a variety of charitable causes totaled over £12,000.

Engage Mutual

2011 Winners of the Engage Mutual Man of The Match Award
  14 May 	Huddersfield v St Helens 	
Danny Brough (Huddersfield) - donated to Brennan Rooney Fund
 13 May 	Warrington v Castleford
Matt King (Warrington) - donated to Paul Darbyshire Foundation
 30 April 	Harlequins v Salford
Matty Smith (Salford) - donated to Broadgreen Hospital Cardiac Unit
 29 April 	Castleford v Leeds
Carl Ablett (Leeds) - donated to Laura Crane Trust
 25 April - 	Catalans v Bradford
Ian Henderson (Catalans) - donated to Leukaemia Foundation UK
 22 April - Hull FC v Hull KR
Tom Briscoe (Hull FC) - donated to The Steve Prescott Foundation
 22 April -	Wigan v St Helens 	
Pat Richards (Wigan) - donated to Wigan Warriors Foundation
 21 April -	Bradford v Leeds
Rob Burrow (Leeds) - donated to RTS Suffers
 16 April -	Salford v Bradford
Ashley Gibson (Salford) - donated to Salford's Children Hospital
 15 April -	St Helens v Wakefield
Jonny Lomax (St Helens)- donated to TRU Rehab (Brain Damage Charity)
 9 April  -	Hull KR v Leeds
Ben Galea (Hull KR) - donated to Women and Children's Hospital - Hull
 8 April  -	Huddersfield v Warrington
Danny Brough (Huddersfield) - donated to Brennan Rooney Fund
 2 April  -	Salford v Crusaders
Gareth Thomas (Crusaders) - donated to Candlelighters
 1 April  -	Leeds v Wigan 	
Danny Buderus (Leeds) - donated to Japanese Tsunami Appeal
 26 March 	Hull KR v Huddersfield 	
Jermaine McGillvary (Huddersfield) - donated to RiasRainbow.com
 25 March 	Wigan v Warrington 	
Ben Westwood (Warrington) - donated to Warrington Maternity Unit's Baby Bereavement Suite
 19 March 	Leeds v St Helens
Jamie Foster (St Helens) - donated to Japanese Earthquake Appeal
 18 March 	Huddersfield v Wigan 	
Josh Charnley (Wigan) - donated to Japanese Earthquake Appeal
 12 March 	Castleford v Catalan
Craig Huby (Castleford) - donated to 	NZ & Queensland Disaster Fund
 11 March 	Wakefield v Warrington
Ben Harrison (Warrington) - donated to Warrington Wolves Charitable Foundation
 5 March 	Warrington v Leeds 	
Rhys Evans (Warrington) - donated to Warrington Wolves Charitable Foundation
 4 March 	Harlequins v Huddersfield
Shaun Lunt (Huddersfield) - donated to Help the Heroes
 26 February 	Crusaders v Bradford
Brett Kearney (Bradford) - donated to	Breast Cancer Research
 25 February 	St Helens v Warrington 	
Gareth Carvell (Warrington) - donated to Deaf Children's Society
 19 February 	Castleford v Huddersfield
Rangi Chase (Castleford)- donated to Prince of Wales Hospice, Pontefract
 18 February 	Hull FC v Leeds
Rob Burrow (Leeds) - donated to Prince of Wales Hospice, Pontefract

References

Charity fundraisers
Rugby league trophies and awards